Adorján Czipleá (1639–1664) was a Hungarian Christian Kabbalist and mystic. Not much is known about his life except for the fact that in 1662 – after some years of formal education in his native country – he journeyed to England in order to continue his philosophical and theological studies. There is no knowledge regarding the circumstances of his death, which occurred within two years after his arrival.

While in England, Czipleá wrote a controversial short treatise entitled De ente et malo (On Being and Evil) which circulated among a narrow group of prominent European intellectuals including, among others, Henry More, Joseph Glanvill, Thomas Vaughan and Franciscus Mercurius van Helmont. Although this work appears to be lost, records of its radical views (indictable for heresy at the time) survived in contemporary accounts of it. Probably the most detailed of these accounts is found in Méric Casaubon's letter to Edward Stillingfleet, dated September 1670:

Scholarly interest in his idiosyncratic mysticism has only recently begun to emerge. Speculation regarding Czipleá's Hermetic and Kabbalistic sources ranges from John Dee, Pico della Mirandola and Johann Reuchlin, while attention has been drawn to his possible influence on the Cambridge Platonists and Metaphysical Poets.

1639 births
1664 deaths
Kabbalists
Christian Kabbalists